The Sol Dynamic is a Brazilian single-place paraglider that was designed and produced by Sol Paragliders of Jaraguá do Sul in the mid-2000s. It is now out of production.

Design and development
The Dynamic was designed as an advanced and competition glider. The models are each named for their relative size.

Variants
Dynamic S
Small-sized model for lighter pilots.
Dynamic M
Mid-sized model for medium-weight pilots.
Dynamic L
Large-sized model for heavier pilots.

Specifications (Dynamic M)

References

Dynamic
Paragliders